Ché Nunnely (born 4 February 1999) is a Dutch professional footballer who plays as a right winger for Heerenveen.

Club career

Ajax
Nunnely joined the Ajax Youth Academy form the youth ranks of FC Utrecht in 2012. From the age of 16 he was a permanent fixture in the clubs' A1 selection, the under-19 team, having won the U19 national championship on three occasions (2018–19, 2016–17, 2015–16). He made his professional debut in the Eerste Divisie for Jong Ajax on 13 January 2017 in a game against FC Emmen. Unable to break into the first team, Nunnely transferred to Willem II having played two seasons for the reserves team Jong Ajax, amassing 42 caps while scoring 10 goals and helping his side to win the 2017–18 Eerste Divisie title.

Willem II
On 19 June 2019, it was announced that Nunnely had signed a three-year contract with Eredivisie side Willem II. He made his debut on 2 August in a 3–1 away win over PEC Zwolle. On 10 November he scored his first two goals of the season in the home game against PSV, lifting his team to a 2–1 victory. For the 2019–20 season, Nunnely finished with four goals and six assists to his name, achieved in 25 league appearances.

Heerenveen
On 19 January 2023, Nunnely joined Heerenveen on a contract until the end of the season with an option for a further two years. On 4 February, he debuted for the club against FC Utrecht as a substitute in the 70th minute, being 1-0 down. 2 minutes before time, he scored the equalizer, but his goal was ruled offside.

International career
Born in the Netherlands, Nunnely is of Afro-Surinamese descent. Nunnely was part of various Dutch national youth selections. He reached the semifinals at the 2016 UEFA European Under-17 Championship with the Netherlands U17. He also reached the semifinals of the 2019 UEFA European Under-19 Championship with the Netherlands U19 as well. Both times they were eliminated by Portugal.

Honours
Jong Ajax	
 Eerste Divisie: 2017–18

References

External links
 

1999 births
Footballers from Almere
Dutch sportspeople of Surinamese descent
Living people
Dutch footballers
Netherlands youth international footballers
Association football forwards
Jong Ajax players
Willem II (football club) players
SC Heerenveen players
Eerste Divisie players
Eredivisie players